Brigadier-General Cecil Faber Aspinall-Oglander  (08 February 1878 – 23 May 1959) was a 20th Century British military historian, noted for his works on the First World War.

Early life
Cecil Faber Aspinall was born in Wrexham, Wales in 1878, the eldest son of Henry Edmund Aspinall and Kate née Williams. He received his formal education at the Isle of Wight College, and Rugby School. He started his military careers with commissions in the Volunteer Force and the Militia (United Kingdom), prior to receiving a regular service commission in the Royal Munster Fusiliers.

First World War
In March 1915, he was informed that he would be joining the staff of Sir Ian Hamilton's Mediterranean Expeditionary Force. He was one of Sir Ian Hamilton’s most trusted aides during the Gallipoli campaign (1915–1916), where his actions saw him mentioned in despatches over a dozen times. In 1916 he was appointed Chief Staff Officer of the 63rd (Royal Naval) Division, involved in the final phase of the Somme operations. In November 1917, Aspinall moved up to be Brigadier-General General Staff of VIII Corps and remained in this role for the remainder of the war.

Postwar and military retirement
Aspinall retired from the Army in 1920 and was employed by the Historical Section of the British Committee of Imperial Defence, researching and writing the text of several volumes of the British History of the Great War.

During the Second World War he raised and commanded the 20th (East Wight) Battalion, Hampshire Home Guard.

Death
Falls died in his 81st year at Nunwell, on the Isle of Wight, on 23 April 1959. This location was long associated with the Oglander baronets. His second wife, Joan Oglander, came from a long line of descendants that had lived at Nunwell.

Publications

References

Further reading

External links
 
 Correspondence held by King's College London: Liddell Hart Centre for Military Archives
 Profile on The Peerage for Cecil Faber Aspinall
 Profile on WorldCat, works:58 works in 196 publications in 2 languages and 997 library holdings.

1878 births
1959 deaths
British Army General List officers
British Army generals of World War I
British military historians
British military writers
Companions of the Order of St Michael and St George
People educated at Rugby School
Recipients of the Croix de Guerre 1914–1918 (France)
Royal Munster Fusiliers officers
Historians of World War I
Welsh military personnel
British Army brigadiers